Tactusa similis is a moth of the family Erebidae first described by Michael Fibiger in 2010. It is known from northern Thailand.

The wingspan is about 10 mm. The forewing is relatively short and narrow. The ground colour is yellowish white, with a basal-costal patch and dorsomedial triangular patch. It is white between the basal and antemedial lines, and narrowly white between the triangular patch and the subterminal line. The subterminal and terminal areas, including the fringes are blackish brown, except for two small beige areas near the costa. The crosslines are absent, except for the weakly marked subterminal and terminal lines. The hindwing is whitish, with an indistinct discal spot and the underside is unicolorous grey.

References

Micronoctuini
Taxa named by Michael Fibiger
Moths described in 2010